Amcotts Moor Woman is the name given to a bog body discovered in 1747 in a bog near Amcotts, Lincolnshire, England, who lived sometime between A.D. 200 and 400.

Discovery
In the summer of 1747, a peat digger unearthed the body of a woman through roughly six feet of peat moss. The man quickly fled after his shovel struck a shoe with partial remains of a human foot still inside. The following October, Dr. George Stovin, after hearing of the discovery set out with his team to finish the excavation. Dr. Stovin concluded that the woman's body was bent so her head and feet were close to touching. Stovin described the skin of corpse to be  strong. With the body, a pair of shoes were found, one of which was damaged by the shovel of its discoverer. The sandals were said to have tawny colour and to be pliable. The bones of the woman's foot were found inside of the sandals, as the bones of the arms and thighs were found inside of the skin. The hand and fingernails were described to have been well preserved, however, they had been lost when they were sent for study.

References 

1747 archaeological discoveries
1747 in England
Archaeology of England
Bog bodies

External links
a bog body and it's shoes from amcotts